Neil Adsett SC is an Australian lawyer. He served as Attorney General of Tonga from 2012 to 2014.

Adsett is from Australia and works as a law consultant, specialising in revising national statutes. He has produced revisions of the laws of Fiji, Tonga, Tuvalu, and other countries.

In 2008 he worked as Tonga's Law Revision Commissioner. He was subsequently appointed as Tonga's first anti-corruption commissioner. In January 2012 he was appointed as Attorney General. Shortly afterwards he was appointed Senior counsel. He resigned in June 2014, as it was "the right time now for a Tongan lawyer to take over".

References

Living people
Australian lawyers
Tongan lawyers
Attorneys General of Tonga
Year of birth missing (living people)